Brickvention is an annual volunteer-run fan-based Lego convention held in Victoria, Australia. Brickvention is held annually on the third weekend of January at the Royal Exhibition Building in Melbourne. Brickvention 2021 was held on 17–18 January 2021.

In 2016 Brickvention celebrated its 10th anniversary, sharing LEGO displays with over 20,000 members of the public.

Brickvention is facilitated by a volunteer Organisation called Brickventures Incorporated. 10 volunteers from around Victoria spend 12 months planning and organising the event for the wider community.

Brickvention has played host to LEGO Models from some of the world's greatest LEGO Builders. From its conception to 2016, LEGO Certified Professional Ryan McNaught was a guest judge of Brickvention and decided on prize winners for the annual competition element held for the accepted builders.

See also
 LeoCAD

References

External links

Conventions in Australia
Lego conventions
2007 establishments in Australia
Annual events in Australia
Culture in Victoria (Australia)
Summer events in Australia